Thomas Putnam ( – , 1699) was a member of the Putnam family and a resident of Salem Village (present-day Danvers, Massachusetts) and a significant accuser in the notorious 1692 Salem witch trials.  

His father, Lt. Thomas Putnam Sr. (1615–1686), was one of Salem's wealthiest residents. He was excluded from major inheritances by both his father and father-in-law. His half-brother, Joseph, who had benefited most from their father's estate, married into the rival Porter family, fueling ill will between the clans. Putnam, his wife, and one of his daughters (Ann Putnam Jr.) all levied accusations of witchcraft, many of them against extended members of the Porter family, and testified at the trials. He is responsible for the accusations of 43 people, and his daughter is responsible for 62. He and his wife had 12 children in total. Both Thomas Putnam and Ann Putnam Sr. died in 1699, leaving 10 children orphans, two children having predeceased them.

Arthur Miller's The Crucible 
In the 1953 play, The Crucible, by Arthur Miller, Thomas Putnam is married to Ann Putnam, and together have a daughter, Ruth Putnam, who is afflicted with a grave illness, similar to that of Betty Parris. They both have lost seven children in childbirth, and pointed to witchcraft as the cause of it. He appears in Act 1 and is apparent during Act 3. Thomas twists Reverend Parris to make him on his side, urging him to see that it is witchcraft that is making Salem go mad. He uses the trials to get the other villagers' land, such as Giles Corey's. Giles later takes Thomas to court regarding the issue.

Notes

References

1652 births
1699 deaths
Accusers in witch trials
People of the Salem witch trials
Thomas